Peter John Carroll  (born 1944) is an Australian actor and the father of actress Tamsin Carroll.

Early life and education
Peter Carroll was born in Sydney, New South Wales in 1944. In his youth, Carroll was a boy soprano and won five awards in the City of Sydney Eisteddfodd in 1963.

Carroll attended the University of Sydney, where he earned a Bachelor of Arts, and the University of New South Wales, where he earned a Master of Arts with Honours. While undertaking his education at the University of Sydney, he commenced amateur acting; after graduating, he worked as a drama teacher for two years.

Carroll later attended the Central School of London.

In 2003, Carroll received an honorary Doctorate of Creative Awards from the University of Wollongong.

Honours
 Member of the Order of Australia for "significant service to the performing arts as an actor" in the 2021 Queen's Birthday Honours.

Awards

Theatre
 Sydney Theatre Company: The Crucible, The War of the Roses, Gallipoli, Serpents Teeth, A Midsummer Night's Dream, The Season at Sarsaparilla, The Art of War, The Bourgeois Gentleman, The Lost Echo, Mother Courage, Victory, The Cherry Orchard, Harbour, The Republic of Myopia, Thyestes, The Tempest 
 Company B: Hamlet, The Blind Giant is Dancing, The Tempest, The Chairs, Stuff Happens
 Musical theatre including Evita, Sweeney Todd, Les Miserables, Jesus Christ Superstar, Joseph and the Amazing Technicolour Dreamcoat, The Threepenny Opera, Cats, Crazy for You, Man of La Mancha, Eureka, Into the Woods, Summer Rain, Chitty Chitty Bang Bang.

Filmography

Movies 
The Last Wave (1977) – Michael Zeadler
The Chant of Jimmie Blacksmith (1978) – McCready
Newsfront (1978) – Newsco scriptwriter
The More Things Change... (1986) – Roley
Fatty Finn (1980) – Teacher
The Girl Who Met Simone de Beauvoir in Paris (1980)
Waking Ned (1998) – Villager of Tullymore
A Wreck, a Tangle (2000) – Science Voice Over
Sunday (2000) – Herb
Black and White (2001) – Viscount Simonds
Happy Feet (2006) – Elder
Sleeping Beauty (2011) – Man 1
Crazy Rich Asians (2018) - Lord Calthorpe
The Power of the Dog (2021) - Old Gent

Television 
Cass (1978) – Tom
The John Sullivan Story (1979) – Commissioner Petrovic
Ride on Stranger (1979) – Mervyn Leggatt
A Country Practice (1982–1992) – Mr. Brown/Stewart Innes
Five Mile Creek (1983) – Charles Withers
A Descant for Gossips (1983) – Robert Moller
Who Killed Baby Azaria? (1983) – Mr. Phillips QC
The Dismissal (1983) – Narrator/Liberal MP
Melba (1987) – David Mitchell
Captain James Cook (1987) – Dr. Daniel Solander
Custody (1988) – Narrator
The Rainbow Warrior Conspiracy (1989)
Cassidy (1989) – Gotham
Water Rats (1996) – Joseph Craig
Doom Runners (1997) – William
Tales of the South Seas (2000) – Gahv
The Farm (2001) – Fenwick
Changi (2001) – Dr. Hurrell
Corridors of Power (2001) – Voice in Toilet
The Diamond of Jeru (2001) – Clifton Vandover
Grass Roots (2000–2003) – Rev. Peter Summerhaze

Other 
Crocodile Dundee (1986) – Dialogue Coach

References

External links

1944 births
Living people
Members of the Order of Australia
Australian male film actors
Australian male television actors
Helpmann Award winners
Male actors from Sydney